The 1992–93 NBA season was the fifth season for the Miami Heat in the National Basketball Association (NBA). In the 1992 NBA draft, the Heat selected Harold Miner out of USC with the 12th pick. During the off-season, the Heat acquired John Salley from the Detroit Pistons. However, the team got off to a sluggish 10–25 start as they were bitten by the injury bug, with most notably second-year guard Steve Smith missing the first 31 games of the season with a knee injury, and Kevin Edwards only playing just 40 games, and being benched after starting in 30 of them. The team held an 18–31 record at the All-Star break. With Smith back in the lineup, the Heat played solid basketball in February and March winning 18 of 28 games. Ultimately, they were not able to capitalize on the momentum of their first playoff appearance last year, and ended up losing six of their final seven games. They ended up finishing fifth in the Atlantic Division, and 11th in the Eastern Conference with a 36–46 record, five games behind the 8th-seeded Indiana Pacers.

Glen Rice led the team in scoring averaging 19.0 points per game, while Rony Seikaly averaged 17.1 points, 11.8 rebounds and 1.2 blocks per game, and Smith provided the team with 16.0 points and 5.6 assists per game in 48 games. In addition, Grant Long averaged 14.0 points, 7.5 rebounds and 1.4 steals per game, while Edwards contributed 13.9 points and 1.7 steals per game in only just 40 games, Bimbo Coles provided with 10.6 points and 4.6 assists per game, and Miner contributed 10.3 points per game off the bench, and won the Slam Dunk Contest during the All-Star Weekend in Salt Lake City.

Following the season, Edwards, one of the few players left from the team's inaugural season, signed as a free agent with the New Jersey Nets.

Draft picks

Roster

Regular season

Season standings

y – clinched division title
x – clinched playoff spot

z – clinched division title
y – clinched division title
x – clinched playoff spot

Record vs. opponents

Game log

Player statistics

NOTE: Please write the players statistics in alphabetical order by last name.

Awards, records, and honors
 Harold Miner, NBA All-Star Weekend Slam Dunk Contest Champion

Transactions

References

Miami Heat seasons
Miami Heat
Miami Heat
Miami Heat